The Ontario Agency for Health Protection and Promotion (more commonly known as Public Health Ontario)  is the Ontario Government agency responsible for providing scientific and technical advice to those working to promote and protect the health of people in Ontario, Canada.

History and organization 
The Ontario Agency for Health Protection and Promotion was established in 2008 by the Ontario Agency for Health Protection and Promotion Act, 2007. The OAHPP is an agent of the Crown (i.e. a Crown agency) and is considered an arm's-length government agency. It has a mandate to provide scientific and technical advice to those working to protect and promote the health of Ontario residents. Its objectives include establishing, operating and maintaining laboratory centers, providing laboratory services, and operating Ontario public health laboratories previously operated by the Ministry of Health and Long-Term Care.

As of December 15, 2008, the Ministry of Health and Long-Term Care announced that all employees, programs and functions of the Ontario Public Health Laboratories (OPHL) had been transferred to the OAHPP. In early June 2011, the OAHPP announced that it would operate under the name Public Health Ontario beginning on June 11, 2011.

See also 

 Chief Medical Officer of Health (As of June 2021 Kieran Moore)

References

External links
 

Crown corporations of Ontario
2008 establishments in Ontario
Government agencies established in 2008
Medical and health organizations based in Ontario
Public health organizations
Organizations associated with the COVID-19 pandemic
Organizations based in Toronto